Chief Sir Leo Dion GCL KBE CMG QPM (born 1950) is a Papua New Guinean politician. He was the Deputy Prime Minister of Papua New Guinea from 2012 to 2017.

He worked as a police officer before entering politics, and was awarded the Queen's Police Medal.

Dion was first elected to the National Parliament in a by-election in 2000, for the East New Britain provincial seat. His election to the provincial seat also made him Governor of the East New Britain province, of which he was previously deputy governor. He has been re-elected continuously to the seat and governorship since then, most recently in 2012.

Formerly a member of the National Alliance Party, he joined the Triumph Heritage Empowerment Party ("THE Party") prior to the 2012 general election. Following that election, Prime Minister Peter O'Neill appointed him Deputy Prime Minister and Minister for Inter-Government Relations. In June 2014, Dion joined O'Neill's People's National Congress Party.

Dion lost his seat to former MP Nakikus Konga at the 2017 election.

References

Living people
1950 births
Members of the National Parliament of Papua New Guinea
Deputy Prime Ministers of Papua New Guinea
Governors of East New Britain Province
Triumph Heritage Empowerment Party politicians
National Alliance Party (Papua New Guinea) politicians
Knights Commander of the Order of the British Empire
Companions of the Order of St Michael and St George
Commonwealth recipients of the Queen's Police Medal